Ulrike Almut Sandig (born 1979) is a German writer. She was born in Großenhain in the former GDR, and has lived in Riesa, Leipzig and Berlin. She studied religion and indology at university, and then studied at the German Institute for Literature in Leipzig.
 
She started her writing career by distributing her poems in public places in Leipzig. She has published three volumes of poetry: Zunder (2005/2009), Streumen (2007), and Dickicht (2011). Her first book of short stories titled Flamingos came out in 2010. She has also written for the radio, and published audiobooks.

She has received numerous prizes, among them the Leonce-und-Lena Prize (2009) and the Droste-Preis for Emerging Talent (2012). She has also done residencies in Helsinki and Sydney. Her work has been translated into various languages, and an English-language selection of her work, translated by Karen Leeder, was runner-up in the Schlegel-Tieck Prize.

Sandig lives with her family in Berlin.

Memberships
 Akademie der Wissenschaften und der Literatur, Mainz
 PEN Centre Germany, Darmstadt

Publications

In English

References

Further reading

External links

 
 
 

1979 births
Living people
21st-century German poets
German women poets